Zera may refer to:
 Zera (genus)
 Zera (character)
 Zera (musician)